The Springfield Model 1812 Musket is a .69 caliber, flintlock musket manufactured by the Springfield Armory.

The War of 1812 revealed many weaknesses in the earlier Model 1795 Musket. The Model 1812 was an attempt to improve both the design and manufacturing process of the musket. The design borrowed heavily from the French Charleville model 1777 musket. The Springfield Model 1812 musket arrived too late to be of use in the War of 1812 but would later become standard issue to regular infantry and militia units.

The Model 1812 was a .69 caliber smoothbore musket, with a 42-inch (107 cm) barrel and a 54-inch (137 cm) stock, and a total length of 57-inch (145 cm). The Model 1812 was produced only at Springfield: the M1795 would continue in production at Harpers Ferry into 1818.

The Model 1812 was produced in a quantity of almost 30,000 between the years 1814 and 1816. It was replaced by the Model 1816 Musket. However, the Model 1812 remained in service for many years, and was even used in the American Civil War, mostly by the Confederate forces. By the start of the Civil war, the weapon was considered to be old and obsolete but was needed to fill arms shortages.

Some Model 1812 muskets were later converted to percussion lock firing mechanisms. The percussion cap system was much more reliable and weatherproof than the flintlock system used on the Model 1812 in its original configuration.

See also
 List of individual weapons of the U.S. Armed Forces
 List of wars involving the United States
 Military history of the United States
 United States Armed Forces
 Military of the Confederate States of America
 Charleville musket
 Brown Bess
 Potzdam Musket 1723
 M1752 Musket
 Springfield musket
 Harpers Ferry Model 1803
 M1819 Hall rifle
 Pattern 1853 Enfield
 Springfield Rifle
 Richmond rifle
 Fayetteville rifle
 Musket
 Rifle
 Carbine
 Historical reenactment
 American Civil War reenactment

References

Muskets
Weapons of the Confederate States of America
American Civil War weapons
Firearms of the United States
Springfield firearms